Gernsbach is a town in the district of Rastatt, in Baden-Württemberg, Germany. Twin towns are Baccarat in France and Pergola, Marche in Italy.
The town is the historic centre of the lower Murg Valley and forms a central place of mid-size with Gaggenau.
Gernsbach is an officially recognised climatic spa with a historic centre. Furthermore, Gernsbach is noted for its paper industry and Paper Centre, a service provider in the field of training, staff qualification and management consultancy for the German and Swiss paper and pulp industry.

Geography

Geographical position 
Gernsbach is located in the northern part of the Black Forest on both banks of the river Murg at 150 to 988 meters above the sea level.
In the west the 668 m high mountain Merkur provides a distinctive landscape. In the east there is the 908 m high mountain Teufelsmühle.

Area 

The local subdistrict area of Gernsbach including all quarters is 8208,86 hectares of which most is covered by forest areas – 6628,00 hectares (81% of the total area). That is more than twice as much as the average ratio in Baden-Württemberg. Settlement and traffic areas make up 6% - less than half of the average. 12% of the area used for agriculture.

Quarters 
The core city is divided into “to the right of the Murg” (including: Kelterberg, Entensee, Kolonie and Nord) and “to the left of the Murg” (including: Klingele, Waldbach, Faltergass, Heppeler, Walheimer Hof, Stadtbuckel, Siedlung, Hahnbachweg, Panoramaweg and Weinau)
In the 20th century following townships were suburbanized:
Scheuern (in 1936)
After the redivision of local government in the 1970s
Lautenbach (in 1973)
Hilpertsau (in 1974)
Obertsrot (in 1974)
Staufenberg (in 1974)
 Reichental (in 1975) (doubling the total subdistrict area of Gernsbach)
followed.

Coat of Arms of the quarters

Neighbouring towns
These townships and towns border on Gernsbach:
 in the north: Gaggenau, Loffenau, Bad Herrenalb and Dobel
 in the east: Bad Wildbad and Enzklösterle
 in the south: Forbach and Weisenbach
 in the west: Baden-Baden

History

Beginnings 
A permanent settlement of Gernsbach before the 12th century is not verified. 
At the beginning of the 12th century the Counts of Eberstein bought the “predium” Rotenfels thus allowing the initial settlement of the lower Murg valley.
From Rotenfels the counts of Eberstein ordered to uproot the wooded and swampy valley and to found new settlements. By 1200 the route Loffenau–Scheuern–Gernsbach–Staufenberg was established.
In an ebersteinian inheritance document Gernsbach is first mentioned in written form in 1219 as ‘’Genrespach’’. At that time there was already a differentiation between a Marktdorf (a settlement which had the right to run a market) and a Kirchdorf (a settlement which had the right to build a church). Gernsbach (also called “Hof” –‘’a little settlement of farmers’’) was a Kirchdorf at that time, being located to the left of the Murg in the south of the Waldbach on the ebersteinian allodium.
The local church was the preceding building of today’s St.-Jakobskirche.
To the north of the Waldbach was a Marktdorf on the grounds of the Diocese of Speyer located on a spur, thus having an ideal location for the construction of a fortification.

Sons and daughters of the town

 Ludwig Dill (1848-1940), ship and landscape painter
 Walther Eichrodt, (1890-1978), Protestant theologian 
 Georg Ackermann (athlete) (born 1972), long jumper

Other famous personalities in Gernsbach

 William IV of Eberstein (1497-1562), officially introduced the Reformation in the county of Eberstein in 1556
 Karl Drais (1785-1851), studied forestry teacher and inventor, lived here in 1794 and started on July 28, 1817 from Gernsbach on his running machine to Baden-Baden (second two-wheel drive of history)
 Heinrich Funck (1853-1932), philologist and historian, director of the Higher Bürgerschule in Gernsbach
 Georg Menges (1888-1973), mayor of 1919-1933, local politician of Baden and Baden-Wuerttemberg
 Scipio Colombo (1910-2002), Italian baritone
 Heinz Schimmelpfennig (1919-2010), actor and radio playwright, known as Tatort -  Commissioner Gerber

Gallery

References

Rastatt (district)
Baden